Shahid Javed Burki is a Pakistani-American professional economist who has served as Vice President of the World Bank and as de facto Finance Minister of Pakistan on a caretaker basis.  He has written extensively on economic development and on the political history of Pakistan.

Early life and education 

Born in Shimla, formerly known as Simla, in (then-British) India on 14 September 1938, Burki migrated as a child along with his family to Pakistan at the time of the independence of Pakistan in September 1947.  They settled in Rawalpindi, where his father worked as an official in the Pakistan army headquarters.  Burki is a cousin of the cricketer Javed Burki.  Burki was educated at Presentation Convent High School, Rawalpindi and St Mary's College, Rawalpindi. Upon graduation he moved to Lahore to study double majors in Physics and Mathematics at Government College University, Lahore. He received his MSc in Physics from the Punjab University in 1959. The following year he was chosen as a Rhodes Scholar from Pakistan and went to Christ Church, Oxford to study economics. He received his MA from Oxford in 1963 and then went to Harvard University as a Mason Fellow for graduate studies in Economics and Public Administration. He holds dual Pakistani and US nationality.

Career at World Bank

Burki joined the World Bank in 1974 as a Senior Economist and went on to serve in several senior positions.  He was the (first) Director of the China Department (1987–1994), making him responsible for managing the World Bank's dialogue with the Chinese authorities and supervising all of the Bank's analytical and lending work in China. He persuaded the World Bank's senior management, in the immediate aftermath of the Chinese authorities' repression of the Tiananmen Square protests of 1989, that the Bank should stay actively engaged with China, a stance challenged at the time by many of the Bank's most powerful shareholder countries. He served as the Regional Vice President for Latin America and the Caribbean during 1994–1999.  He took a leave of absence from the World Bank to serve in a caretaker role as Pakistan's de facto Finance Minister for 67 days in 1996–1997 (exercising the responsibilities of the Finance Minister without assuming the title). He retired from the World Bank in 1999.

Publications 

Burki is the author or editor of several books on Pakistan, including: Pakistan Under Bhutto (1980, Macmillan); Pakistan under the Military: Eleven Years of Zia Ul-Haq (with Craig Baxter, 1991, Westview Press);  Pakistan: Fifty Years of Nationhood (1999, Westview Press); A Historical Dictionary of Pakistan (1999, Scarecrow Press); and Changing Perceptions, Altered Reality: Pakistan's Economy under Musharraf, 1999–2006 (2007, Oxford University Press, Karachi). Other publications on development include: A Study of Chinese Communes (1969, Harvard University Press); First Things First (with Paul Streeten, 1981, Oxford University Press); and Transforming Socialist Economies: Lessons from Cuba and Beyond (edited, with Daniel P. Erikson, 2005, Palgrave Macmillan).

Other activities 
In the past, Burki has written opinion pieces for a Pakistani newspaper (Dawn). He is currently a frequent contributor of opinion pieces to the Daily Times.

Burki is the Chairman of The Shahid Javed Burki Institute of Public Policy at NetSol (BIPP) in Lahore, Pakistan.

References

1938 births
Pakistani economists
Pakistani Rhodes Scholars
Finance Ministers of Pakistan
Alumni of Christ Church, Oxford
Harvard University alumni
Pakistani bankers
Shahid Javed
World Bank people
Living people
University of the Punjab alumni
Government College University, Lahore alumni
Pashtun people
Pakistani officials of the United Nations
Pakistani emigrants to the United States
Mason Fellows